"Sunday and Me" is a song written by Neil Diamond and was released by Jay and the Americans in 1965. The song went to No.18 on the Billboard Hot 100 in 1965 and was on the charts for 8 weeks.

The song went to No.19 in Canada in December 1965 and was on the charts for 6 weeks.

"Sunday and Me" was the first songwriting success for Neil Diamond.

References

1965 singles
Songs written by Neil Diamond
Jay and the Americans songs
1965 songs
United Artists Records singles